Sagardighi is one of "Great Ponds" in the heart of Cooch Behar, the district headquarters of Cooch Behar district, West Bengal, India. The name means an ocean-like pond, exaggerated in view of its great significance. As well as being popular with people, it also attracts migratory birds each winter.

It is surrounded by many important administrative buildings, like District Magistrates Office, Administrative Building of North Bengal State Transport Corporation,  BSNL's DTO Office on the West; Office of the Superintendent of Police, District Library, Municipality Building on the South, Office of BLRO, State Bank of India's Cooch Behar Main Branch and many other on the East and RTO office, Foreigner's registration office, District Court etc. on the North.

Lakes of West Bengal
Tourist attractions in Cooch Behar district